The fourth season of the television series The Wire commenced airing in the United States on September 10, 2006, concluded on December 10, 2006, and contained 13 episodes. It introduces Baltimore's school system and several middle school students while continuing to examine the remnants of the Barksdale Organization, the ascendant Stanfield Organization, the Baltimore Police Department and politicians.

The fourth season aired on Sundays at 9:00 pm ET in the United States. The season was released on DVD as a four disc boxed set under the title of The Wire: The Complete Fourth Season on December 4, 2007 by HBO Video.

Production

Crew
Playwright and television writer/producer Eric Overmyer joined the crew for the show's fourth season as a consulting producer and writer. He had previously worked on Homicide and was brought into the full-time production staff to replace George Pelecanos who scaled back his involvement in order to concentrate on his next book and he worked on the fourth season solely as a writer. David Mills, Emmy-award winner, Homicide and The Corner writer and college friend of Simon, joined the writing staff in the fourth season. Regular writer Ed Burns became a producer on The Wire in this season.

Cast
The focus of the fourth season shifted between a local school, the mayoral election, police department politics and action on the street corners. The returning starring cast consisted of Dominic West as Officer Jimmy McNulty, the formerly insubordinate detective who attempts to shed his ability and his problems in favor of a better life.  West was at the time homesick and wanting to spend time with his young daughter in England; he also felt the character's plot arc had reached a reasonable end point in season 3, so West arranged with the writers for McNulty's role to be greatly reduced in Season 4.  

Lance Reddick reprised his role as newly promoted Major Cedric Daniels, now commanding the western district. One of Daniels's sergeants within the district was Sergeant Ellis Carver, portrayed by Seth Gilliam. Robert Wisdom reprised his role as former western district commander Howard "Bunny" Colvin, who has become a field researcher after a short stint working in hotel security following his retirement from the Baltimore Police Department.  

The Major Crimes Unit saw a shift in personnel this season. Kima Greggs, portrayed by Sonja Sohn, and Lester Freamon, portrayed by Clarke Peters, transferred to the Homicide Unit after the new lieutenant of the Major Crimes Unit ends the wire and halts Freamon's investigation of the Barksdale money. Corey Parker-Robinson portrayed Detective Leander Sydnor, one of two detectives who remain in the Major Crimes Unit after the arrival of the new lieutenant. Domenick Lombardozzi returned as Thomas "Herc" Hauk, a former member of the Major Crimes Unit whose work on the mayor's security detail earns him a promotion to sergeant and a transfer back to his old unit after Freamon and Greggs' departure.

Wendell Pierce portrayed veteran homicide detective Bunk Moreland. Deirdre Lovejoy starred as assistant state's attorney Rhonda Pearlman, the legal liaison between the unit and the courthouse. Andre Royo returned as Bubbles, who continued to indulge his drug addiction and act as an occasional informant. Jim True-Frost portrayed Roland "Prez" Pryzbylewski, a former member of the Major Crimes Unit who has become a teacher in an inner city school after inadvertently killing a fellow officer in season three.

The police were overseen by two commanding officers more concerned with politics and their own careers than the case, Deputy Commissioner of Operations William Rawls (John Doman) and  Commissioner Ervin Burrell (Frankie Faison). At city hall, Tommy Carcetti (Aidan Gillen) was an ambitious city councilman seeking to become mayor. Joining the cast for the fourth season was Reg E. Cathey as Carcetti's deputy campaign manager, Norman Wilson. Also joining the cast after having a recurring role during the third season was Glynn Turman as Mayor Clarence Royce. 

On the streets, former Barksdale crew chief Bodie Broadus (J.D. Williams) joined the organization of new drug kingpin Marlo Stanfield (Jamie Hector). Michael K. Williams portrayed renowned stick-up man Omar Little. Joining the cast this season after having a recurring role in season three is Chad L. Coleman as Dennis "Cutty" Wise, a reformed member of the Barksdale organization who has opened a boxing gym for neighborhood children.

Two members of the third season starring cast did not return for the fourth season following the termination of their characters' storylines. Both Wood Harris (Avon Barksdale) and Idris Elba (Stringer Bell) left the starring cast in the final episode of the third season.

Recurring characters
Many guest stars from the earlier seasons reprised their roles. Proposition Joe (Robert F. Chew), the East Side's cautious drug kingpin, became more cooperative with the Stanfield Organization following the death of Stringer Bell. His lieutenant, and nephew, "Cheese" (Method Man) continued to elude the Major Crimes Unit investigation. Hassan Johnson reprises his role as incarcerated Barksdale enforcer Wee-Bey Brice. Former Barksdale enforcer Slim Charles (Anwan Glover) returned as a new recruit to Proposition Joe's organization.
Several members of the  Stanfield Organization introduced in season three also returned: Chris Partlow (Gbenga Akinnagbe), Stanfield's chief enforcer; and Felicia "Snoop" Pearson (Felicia Pearson), Partlow's protégé. Tray Chaney continues to portray former Barksdale crew chief Poot Carr, who joins the Stanfield organization this season. 

Michael Hyatt reprised her role as Brianna Barksdale. Michael Kostroff returned as the defense attorney Maurice Levy. Isiah Whitlock, Jr. reprised his role as corrupt State Senator Clay Davis whose involvement with Barksdale money causes him trouble with the Major Crimes Unit. Omar Little's crew shifted focus to the Stanfield Organization and the New Day Co-op and consisted of his new boyfriend Renaldo (Ramón Rodríguez), partner  Kimmy (Kelli R. Brown), and advisor Butchie (S. Robert Morgan).

Many guest stars also reprised their characters from the police department. Returning guest stars in the homicide unit included Delaney Williams as Sergeant Jay Landsman, Ed Norris as Detective Ed Norris, and Brian Anthony Wilson as Detective Vernon Holley. Al Brown and Jay Landsman reprised their roles as Major Stan Valchek and Lieutenant Dennis Mello. Michael Salconi recurred as veteran Western patrolman Michael Santangelo. 
Gregory L. Williams played Michael Crutchfield, a cantankerous homicide detective. Joilet F. Harris returned as Caroline Massey, an officer in the Major Crimes Unit. Joining the Major Crimes Unit this season is Kenneth Dozerman (Rick Otto). In the western district, Carver's squad includes Anthony Colicchio (Benjamin Busch), Lloyd "Truck" Garrick (Ryan Sands), and Lambert (Nakia Dillard).

In the political storyline, Cleo Reginald Pizana returned as Coleman Parker, Royce's chief-of-staff. Brandy Burre appeared as Theresa D'Agostino, a political campaign consultant. Frederick Strother performed as Odell Watkins, a state delegate and political king-maker. Christopher Mann played Carcetti's city council colleague Anthony Gray. Maria Broom returns as Marla Daniels, the estranged wife of Major Daniels who is running for a seat on the city council.

The fourth season also saw the return of two former starring characters from the second season: Amy Ryan as Officer Beadie Russell, an officer at the port and Jimmy McNulty's domestic partner, and Paul Ben-Victor as Spiros Vondas, the second in command of the Greek's drug smuggling operation.

The shift of focus to the schools saw the introduction of four young actors in major recurring roles this season: Jermaine Crawford as Duquan "Dukie" Weems; Maestro Harrell as Randy Wagstaff; Julito McCullum as Namond Brice; and Tristan Wilds as Michael Lee. The characters are friends from a West Baltimore middle school. Other new characters from the school included Tootsie Duvall as Assistant Principal Marcia Donnelly; David Parenti (Dan DeLuca), a Professor of Sociology at the University of Maryland who works with Bunny Colvin in the school to study potential violent offenders; Stacie Davis portrayed Miss Duquette, a doctoral student who works with Parenti and Colvin; Aaron "Bug" Manigault (Keenon Brice), Michael Lee's younger brother; Kenard (Thuliso Dingwall), one of the younger members of Namond Brice's circle of friends; and Richard Hidlebird as Principal Claudell Withers.

Main cast
 Dominic West as Jimmy McNulty (9 episodes)
 John Doman as William Rawls (11 episodes)
 Frankie Faison as Ervin Burrell (10 episodes)
 Aidan Gillen as Tommy Carcetti (13 episodes)
 Deirdre Lovejoy as Rhonda Pearlman (9 episodes)
 Clarke Peters as Lester Freamon (11 episodes)
 Wendell Pierce as William "Bunk" Moreland (12 episodes)
 Lance Reddick as Cedric Daniels (12 episodes)
 Andre Royo as Reginald "Bubbles" Cousins (9 episodes)
 Sonja Sohn as Kima Greggs (12 episodes)
 Jim True-Frost as Roland Pryzbylewski (13 episodes)
 Robert Wisdom as Howard "Bunny" Colvin (11 episodes)
 Seth Gilliam as Ellis Carver (11 episodes)
 Domenick Lombardozzi as Thomas "Herc" Hauk (13 episodes)
 Reg E. Cathey as Norman Wilson (13 episodes)
 Chad Coleman as Dennis "Cutty" Wise (7 episodes)
 Jamie Hector as Marlo Stanfield (13 episodes)
 Glynn Turman as Clarence Royce (7 episodes)
 J. D. Williams as Bodie Broadus (9 episodes)
 Michael K. Williams as Omar Little (9 episodes)
 Corey Parker Robinson as Leander Sydnor (11 episodes)

Reception

The fourth season of The Wire is listed as one of the highest rated individual TV seasons of all time on Metacritic with a score of 98 out of 100 based on 21 critics—including 17 perfect score reviews. On Rotten Tomatoes, the season has an approval rating of 100% with an average score of 9.7 out of 10 based on 24 reviews. The website's critical consensus reads, "Realistically flawed characters in harrowing, uncompromising circumstances, along with engrossing storytelling, make The Wire one of TV's top dramas of its time."

Awards and nominations
11th Satellite Awards
Nomination for Best Drama Series

Writers Guild of America Awards
Award for Best Drama Series
Nomination for Best Drama Episode (David Simon & Ed Burns) (Episode: "Final Grades")

23rd TCA Awards
Nomination for Program of the Year
Nomination for Outstanding Achievement in Drama

Episodes

All episodes were made available by HBO six days earlier than their broadcast date, via On Demand.

References

External links 
 
 

 4
2006 American television seasons